Keith Hudson Jr (born December 6, 1984), better known by his stage name Tryfle, is an American rapper signed to The Nu Breed Music Group. He is the youngest son of reggae artist Keith Hudson.

Biography

Born on December 6, 1984, in Cambria Heights, New York, Keith "Tryfle" Hudson is the son of reggae artist Keith Hudson, who was widely known in the reggae circuit between the late 1960s and the early 1980s. Tryfle is signed to The Nu Breed Music Group and is managed by label owner and president Anthony "Fate" Lynch. He was the first artist signed to The Nu Breed Music Group after a chance meeting after a performance at their college in 2004, releasing “Better Than You” later that year.  The first full-length album released by The Nu Breed Music Group was Tryfle's 12/6/84 in December 2004.

In 2007, Tryfle, alongside The Nu Breed Music Group, were semi-finalists in the disc makers Independent Music World Music Series. That year he was also featured on hiphopglobal.com. Hip Hop Global Article In January 2008, he and Th Nu Breed Music Group were the first act featured on Ifyoulove.net, a music-related website.
spotlight article

Musical style 

Tryfle's music is derived from personal experiences with a laid-back rapid-fire flow, similar to the likes of Rakim, Nas, Big Pun, Eminem, and Kool G Rap.

Discography

 2003: Dead Poet Society
 2004: Tryfle: 12/6/84
 2005: Tryfle: Problem Child
 2006: The Nu Breed: Problem Child 2.5: The Nu Breed Remix
 2008: Lost in Translation
 2008: Lost Son

External links
 Official website
  spotlight article
  Hip Hop Global Article
 Garageband Award Page

1984 births
Rappers from New York City
Living people
People from Cambria Heights, Queens
21st-century American rappers